Patriz Ilg (born 5 December 1957 in Aalen-Oberalfingen) is a retired 3000 m steeplechaser from West Germany.

Biography
He won a silver medal at the 1978 European Championships and gold medals at the 1982 European Championships in Athens and the 1983 World Championships in Helsinki. At the European Indoor Championships he competed in the 3000 metres and won the gold medal in 1982 and finished sixth in 1984.

At the 1986 European Championships Ilg came close to defending his title. However, he was overtaken on the final straight by Francesco Panetta (silver) and Hagen Melzer of the GDR (gold). In 1987 Ilg participated in the World Championships final in Rome but missed out on a medal.

His time of 8:15.06 minutes from the 1983 World Championships in Helsinki remained his career best time. This result places him eighth on the German all-time performers list, behind Damian Kallabis, Hagen Melzer, Frank Baumgartl, Rainer Schwarz, Uwe Pflügner, Michael Karst and Steffen Brand.

He won eight German national titles, in 1978, 1980–1982 and 1985–1988. He competed for the sports clubs TG Hofen and LAC Quelle Fürth during his active career.

References

External links
 

1957 births
Living people
People from Aalen
Sportspeople from Stuttgart (region)
West German male middle-distance runners
West German male steeplechase runners
World Athletics Championships medalists
European Athletics Championships medalists
World Athletics Championships athletes for West Germany
World Athletics Championships winners
20th-century German people